Adinarayana is an Indian name and it may refer to 
 Sunkara Venkata Adinarayana Rao,  Orthopaedic surgeon
 Adinarayana Reddy,  Indian politician
 P. Adinarayana Rao, Music director
 Adinarayana Hosahalli, Village in Karnataka